Cnemaspis kawminiae, or Kawmini's day gecko, is a species of diurnal gecko endemic to island of Sri Lanka, described in 2019 from Nuwara Eliya.

Etymology
The specific name kawminiae is named in honor of Hadunneththi Kawmini Mendis, who is the mother of Suranjan Karunarathna, first author. His mother supported the research team financially as well as encourage them including his son.

Taxonomy
The species is closely related to C. kumarasinghei and C. gotaimbarai  morphological aspects.

Ecology
The species was discovered from a granite cave in Mandaram Nuwara, closer to Pidurutalagala Mountain, Nuwara Eliya.

Description
Snout-to-vent length is 33.7 mm in adult male and 35.2 mm in adult female. Granular scales are flat. Chin, gular, pectoral, and abdominal scales are smooth. There are 86–92 paravertebral granules. Two precloacal pores are present. In males, 4–5 femoral pores are present. Median row of subcaudal scales an irregular, sub-rhomboid, and small. Head is small with short snout. Small eyes have round pupils. Dorsum of head, body, limbs and tail is generally light grey to brown. An oblique black line in the interorbital area present. There are five ‘W’-shaped black patches on the occipital area. Three straight, dark brown postorbital stripes are present. Ten grey brownish blotches runs along the tail.

References

kawminiae
Reptiles of Sri Lanka
Endemic fauna of Sri Lanka
Taxa named by Aaron M. Bauer
Taxa named by Anslem de Silva
Taxa named by Mendis Wickramasinghe
Reptiles described in 2019